Fifth Third Bank (5/3 Bank), the principal subsidiary of Fifth Third Bancorp, is an American bank holding company headquartered in Cincinnati, Ohio. Fifth Third is one of the largest consumer banks in the Midwestern United States.

Fifth Third's client base spans retail, small business, corporate, and investment clients. Fifth Third operates 1,100 branches and 50,000  automated teller machines which are in 11 states: Ohio, Florida, Georgia, Illinois, Indiana, Kentucky, Michigan, North Carolina, South Carolina, Tennessee, and West Virginia

The name "Fifth Third" is derived from the names of the bank's two predecessor companies, Third National Bank and Fifth National Bank, which merged in 1909.

The company is ranked 415th on the Fortune 500. Fifth Third Bank is one of the largest banks in the United States.

History

Bank of the Ohio Valley
On June 17, 1858, the Bank of the Ohio Valley opened in Cincinnati, Ohio. On June 23, 1863, the Third National Bank was organized. On April 29, 1871, Third National Bank came into possession of Bank of the Ohio Valley, and by 1882 the bank's capital was around $16 million, considered the state's largest bank capital at the time. In 1888, Queen City National Bank changed its name to Fifth National Bank.

Merger of Third National Bank and Fifth National Bank
On June 1, 1908, Third National Bank and Fifth National Bank merged to become the Fifth-Third National Bank of Cincinnati; the hyphen was later dropped. The merger took place when prohibitionist ideas were gaining popularity, and it is a legend that "Fifth Third" was better than "Third Fifth", which could have been construed as a reference to three fifths of alcohol. The name went through several changes until March 24, 1969, when it was changed to Fifth Third Bank.

Current day operations
In November 2008, the United States Department of the Treasury invested $3.4 billion in the company as part of the Troubled Asset Relief Program and in February 2011, the company repurchased the investment from the Treasury.

For 2020, Fifth Third originated nearly 56,000 mortgages with a value of $10.6 billion.

In January 2022, Fifth Third announced it had acquired the San Francisco-based residential solar power lender, Dividend Finance.

Notable corporate buildings

 Fifth Third Center in Grand Rapids, Michigan
 Fifth Third Center in Charlotte, North Carolina
 Fifth Third Center in Cincinnati, Ohio
 Fifth Third Center in Cleveland, Ohio
 Fifth Third Center in Columbus, Ohio
 Fifth Third Center at One SeaGate in Toledo, Ohio
 Fifth Third Center in Dayton, Ohio
 Fifth Third Center in Nashville, Tennessee
 Fifth Third Center in Tampa, Florida

Naming rights and sponsorships

Fifth Third owns corporate naming rights to the following:
 Fifth Third Field, a baseball stadium in Toledo, Ohio, home of the Toledo Mud Hens, the Triple-A minor league baseball affiliate of the Detroit Tigers.
 Fifth Third Arena, an indoor arena on the campus of the University of Cincinnati, home of the Cincinnati Bearcats Athletics.
 Fifth Third Arena, an indoor arena in Chicago, Illinois, practice facility of the Chicago Blackhawks.
 Fifth Third Bank Stadium, a football stadium in Kennesaw, Georgia, home of the Kennesaw State Owls Athletics.

Fifth Third Bank is a sponsor of the following:

 Cincinnati Bengals – Official Bank of the Cincinnati Bengals.
 Nashville Predators – Official Bank of the Nashville Predators.
 Chicago Blackhawks – Official Partner of the Chicago Blackhawks.
 Tampa Bay Buccaneers – Official Bank of the Tampa Bay Buccaneers.
 Los Angeles Lakers – Official Partner of the Los Angeles Lakers.
 Kennesaw State University – Official Bank of the Kennesaw State Athletics.
 University of Cincinnati – Official Partner of the University of Cincinnati.
 University of Dayton – Official Bank of the University of Dayton.
 Toledo Mud Hens  – Official Bank of the Toledo Mud Hens.
 Columbus Zoo – Official Bank of the Columbus Zoo.
 Gary SouthShore RailCats – Official Bank of the Gary SouthShore RailCats.
 RFK Racing – Primary Sponsor of the No. 17 Ford Mustang GT for Chris Buescher in the NASCAR Cup Series.

See also

References

External links

 

 Banks based in Ohio
 1858 establishments in Ohio
 Companies based in Cincinnati
 American companies established in 1858
 Banks established in 1858
 Companies listed on the Nasdaq
Economy of the Midwestern United States
Economy of the Southeastern United States
Online brokerages
Primary dealers
Subprime mortgage lenders
Systemically important financial institutions
Investment banks in the United States
Mortgage lenders of the United States
Rogue trading banks